Fred Monroe "Zed" Coston (July 12, 1915 – March 23, 2003) was an American football player of the NFL who was drafted by the Philadelphia Eagles. He played one game.

References

1915 births
Players of American football from Dallas
Texas A&M Aggies football players
Philadelphia Eagles players
2003 deaths